Chris Warkentin  (born November 20, 1978) is a businessman and Conservative politician from Alberta, Canada.

Personal life

Warkentin was born in Grande Prairie and raised on the family farm east of Grande Prairie, near the Hamlet of DeBolt in the MD of Greenview. He is an alumnus of the Peace River Bible Institute, and also studied business and marketing at Grande Prairie Regional College before going on to own and operate a custom home building company. He has served on the board of his local Conservative constituency association and was involved with the Reform Party of Canada and the Canadian Alliance.

Political career

Warkentin was elected to the House of Commons of Canada as a Conservative Party of Canada candidate in the riding of Peace River in the 2006 federal election, and was re-elected in that same riding in 2008 and 2011. Following the redistribution of seats before the 2015 federal election, he was re-elected and currently serves as the Member of Parliament for the new riding of Grande Prairie—Mackenzie. Warkentin has won every election he has contested with more than 56% of the vote, and a margin of more than 36 percentage points over the runner-up.

Warkentin served as the Chair of the Aboriginal Affairs and Northern Development Committee from 2011 to 2015. In February 2015, Warkentin was appointed Parliamentary Secretary to the Minister of Public Works and Government Services Canada, Diane Finley. Following the defeat of the Conservative government in October 2015, Warkentin was appointed Official Opposition Critic for Agriculture. In September 2016, a shadow cabinet shuffle moved Warkentin to the role of Official Opposition Deputy House Leader.

Electoral record

References

External links
 Official Website

1978 births
Conservative Party of Canada MPs
Living people
Members of the House of Commons of Canada from Alberta
People from Grande Prairie
21st-century Canadian politicians